Two ships have been named Empire Fulmar:
 , a cargo liner in service during World War II
 , an LST 3 in service 1956-68